Lambak Kanan Library (officially ) is a public library located in Lambak Kanan area in Brunei-Muara, Brunei. It is one of the public libraries operated by Dewan Bahasa dan Pustaka Brunei.

History 
The construction of the building began in 2005 and it took two years to complete. On 18 March 2008, the library was officially opened by the then Minister of Culture, Youth and Sports. The cost of the construction was B$975,525 ($720,000 as of December 2017).

References 

Dewan Bahasa dan Pustaka Library
Libraries in Brunei
Brunei-Muara District
Libraries established in 2008
2008 establishments in Brunei